Victor Monroe Armstrong (born 5 October 1946) is a British film director, stunt coordinator, second unit director, and stunt double—the world's most prolific, according to the Guinness Book of Records.

Career
The  Armstrong doubled for  Harrison Ford in the first three Indiana Jones films,  Timothy Dalton for Flash Gordon, George Lazenby for the Swiss Alps skiing scenes in the Bond film On Her Majesty's Secret Service, and  Christopher Reeve in Superman and Superman II. Reportedly, Armstrong looked so much like Harrison Ford that the crewmembers on the films were constantly mistaking him for Ford. This proved useful when Ford injured his back and had to sit out for filming crucial action sequences in Indiana Jones and the Temple of Doom and Armstrong filled in for him. The stunt where he jumps from a horse onto a German tank in Indiana Jones and the Last Crusade was voted one of the Top Ten film stunts of all time by a panel of experts and Sky Movies viewers in the UK in 2002. On a private photograph taken on the film set, Ford wrote to Armstrong, "If you learn to talk I'm in deep trouble!" Armstrong was unable to work on the fourth Indiana Jones film, Indiana Jones and the Kingdom of the Crystal Skull, due to commitments to The Mummy: Tomb of the Dragon Emperor. However, he had discussed possible action sequences with Steven Spielberg during production of War of the Worlds.

Armstrong is a famed stunt coordinator and action unit director, notable for (amongst others) the action sequences of several James Bond films, War of the Worlds, and I Am Legend. Armstrong was also the opening scene director on Terminator 2: Judgment Day.

In 1993, Armstrong's made his directorial debut with action film Joshua Tree (a.k.a. Army of One), starring Dolph Lundgren, George Segal, Kristian Alfonso and Ken Foree.

He was the subject of This Is Your Life in 2003 when he was surprised by Michael Aspel at Pinewood Studios.

In 2012, Armstrong was Second Unit Director for The Amazing Spider-Man. In 2013, he signed on to direct Left Behind, a remake of the series that got released in 2014. His next directorial effort was the true story A Sunday Horse.
He also worked on the 2022 Amazon Prime Video series The Lord of the Rings: The Rings of Power as second unit director and action director.

Armstrong is a long-serving member of the British Stunt Register.

Awards 
In 2001, he received a Technical Achievement Academy Award for "the Fan Descender for accurately and safely arresting the descent of stunt persons in high freefalls". In 2002, he received the BAFTA Michael Balcon Award.

Personal 
Armstrong is the brother of Andy Armstrong and husband of stuntwoman Wendy Leech, who is the daughter of fellow James Bond stunt performer George Leech. He met her while filming Superman II (she doubled for Margot Kidder) and they have four children between them. Armstrong has two children from his first marriage, and Leech has a daughter from her first marriage. They have one daughter together. Vic is uncle to stuntman James Armstrong and film maker Jesse V Johnson

Bibliography
His memoir My Life as Indiana Jones, James Bond, Superman and Other Action Heroes: The True Adventures of the World's Greatest Stuntman was published by Titan Books in early 2011.

Filmography

 Left Behind (2014) – Director
 The Amazing Spider-Man (2012) – Second Unit Director

 Thor (2011) – Supervising stunt coordinator
 The Green Hornet (2011) – stunt coordinator
 Salt (2010) – stunt coordinator (uncredited)
 Shanghai (2010) – stunt coordinator (uncredited)
 I Am Legend – stunt coordinator

 Die Another Day (2002) – Stunt coordinator
 Charlie's Angels (2000) – Stunt coordinator
 The World Is Not Enough (1999) – Stunt coordinator (uncredited)
 Tomorrow Never Dies (1997) – Stunt coordinator
 Joshua Tree (a.k.a. Army of One) (1993) – Director
 Indiana Jones and the Last Crusade (1989) – Stunt coordinator and Harrison Ford's stunt double (uncredited)
 Indiana Jones and the Temple of Doom (1984) – Stunt arranger and Harrison Ford's stunt double (uncredited)
 Star Wars Episode VI: Return of the Jedi (1983) – Harrison Ford's stunt double (uncredited)
 Raiders of the Lost Ark (1981) – Harrison Ford's stunt double (uncredited)
 An American Werewolf in London (1981) – Bus Driver in Piccadilly Circus
 Exposé (1976) – Acting role

References

External links
 
 

1946 births
Living people
BAFTA Outstanding British Contribution to Cinema Award
English film directors
English stunt performers
Stunt doubles
People from South Bucks District